Letheobia lumbriciformis, also known as the Zanzibar gracile blind snake or wormlike beaked snake, is a species of snake in the Typhlopidae family. It is endemic to East Africa and is known from northeastern Tanzania (including Zanzibar) and from eastern Kenya.

References

Further reading
 Peters, W. 1874. Über einige neue Reptilien (Lacerta, Eremias, Diploglossus, Euprepes, Lygosoma, Sepsina, Ablepharus, Simotes, Onychocephalus). Monatsberichte der Königlich Preussischen Akademie der Wissenschaften zu Berlin, Volume 1874, pp. 368–377.

Letheobia
Snakes of Africa
Reptiles of Kenya
Reptiles of Tanzania
Reptiles described in 1874
Taxa named by Wilhelm Peters